Subhash Chandra Mahavidyalaya is a coeducational postgraduate college in the village of Chakarma, Pindra Tehsil in  Varanasi, India.

Subhash Chandra Mahavidyalaya started in 2011. Its facilities include a library, seminar hall, laboratories, athletic grounds and lecture halls.

The college offers courses leading to a B.Sc., B.A. with 10 subjects. B.Com., B.Ed. with NCTE & UP.Govt. and post graduation in Home Science, psychology, Sociology, Education, Maths, Botany, Chemistry and Zoology

See also 
 List of educational institutions in Varanasi

References 

Colleges in India
Universities and colleges in Varanasi
Mahatma Gandhi Kashi Vidyapith
Educational institutions established in 2011
2011 establishments in Uttar Pradesh